"Around the World" is a song by French electronic music duo Daft Punk. The song was written by the duo and released in April 1997 as the second single from their debut studio album, Homework (1997). It became a major club hit around the world and reached number one on the dance charts in Canada, Spain, the United Kingdom, and the United States. It also peaked at number one in Iceland and Italy. The song's only lyrics are "around the world", repeated 144 times. The music video was directed by Michel Gondry and choreographed by Blanca Li. In October 2011, NME placed it at number 21 on its list "150 Best Tracks of the Past 15 Years".

Composition
The key hook is a steady bassline and a robotic voice singing "around the world" in continuous chains. Daft Punk recalled that the song "was like making a Chic record with a talk box and just playing the bass on the synthesizer". The phrase occurs 144 times in the album version and 80 times in the radio edit. It is composed in the key of E minor and a tempo of 121.3 BPM.

Upon analysis of the song, Michel Gondry noted its distinctive structure: "I realized how genius and simple the music was. Only five different instruments, with very few patterns, each to create numerous possibilities of figures. Always using the repetition, and stopping just before it's too much." He also noted the similarity between the bassline of "Around the World" and that of the Chic song "Good Times". In 2017, computer scientist Colin Morris analyzed 15,000 Billboard Hot 100 hits for repetitiveness, based on compression algorithms. "Around the World" was found to be the most repetitive of the songs analyzed.

A cover version of "Around the World" was released in 2006 as "Around the World Again" by Nicky Van She and Dangerous Dan. A remix of the will.i.am song "I Got It from My Mama" included a sample from "Around the World". Daft Punk did not approve use of the sample, however, and as such subsequently refused will.i.am permission to release the remix. A music video was produced with the sample included, however. A song titled "Around the World" was released by rapper P.M. that contains a sample of "Around the World". Señor Coconut released a cover of "Around the World" on his 2008 album, Atom™ presents: Around the World with Señor Coconut and his Orchestra.

"Around the World" was featured in one episode of first season of MTV animated series Daria. It was also used in the video games Dance Central 3, NBA 2K13 and the trailers for Ubisoft E3 2007 Rayman Raving Rabbids 2.

Critical reception
In a retrospective review, Rayna Khaitan from Albumism noted "all its axon-activating joy". She added further, "Indulgently repetitious, echoing the phrase “around the world” precisely 144 times like some soothing vocoded mantra, the song rallies the collective as together we teetered toward the turn of the millennium." Larry Flick from Billboard wrote that with this "tasty slice of disco/funk, dynamic electronica outfit Daft Punk looks well positioned to build upon the momentum generated by its recent breakthrough hit, 'Da Funk. He noted that the group "does an exemplary job of communicating a hum-along chorus without the aid of a vocalist, opting instead for a stream of caustic key-boards and blippy sound effects". Another American music magazine, Blender put "Around the World" at 172nd place on their list of "500 Greatest Songs Since You Were Born" in 2007. They wrote,  A writer from Complex stated that "its simplicity made it one of the most catchy", and also noted the "unforgettable" music video, "with all kinds of creatures frolicking around a colorful stage." Andy Beevers from Music Week'''s RM'' rated "Around the World" five out of five, picking it as Tune of the Week. He added that it "brings together the punchiest of boogie basslines, trademark crunchy beats, chirpy synths and the vocodored up title line that is repeated ad nauseum [sic] just in case you should forget which tune you're listening to."

Tomorrowland included "Around the World" in their official list of "The Ibiza 500" in 2020.

Accolades

(*) indicates the list is unordered.

Music video

Michel Gondry's music video for the song features five groups of characters on a platform representing a vinyl record: four robots walking around in a circle; four tall athletes (as described by Gondry) wearing tracksuits with small prosthetic heads walking up and down stairs; four women dressed like synchronized swimmers (described by Gondry as "disco girls") moving up and down another set of stairs; four skeletons dancing in the center of the platform; and four mummies dancing in time with the song's drum pattern.

This is meant to be a visual representation of the song; each group of characters represents a different instrument. According to Gondry's notes, the robots represent the singing voice; the physicality and small-minded rapidity of the athletes symbolizes the ascending/descending bass guitar; the femininity of the disco girls represents the high-pitched keyboard; the skeletons dance to the guitar line; and the mummies represent the drum machine.

"Around the World" was Gondry's first attempt at bringing organized dancing to his music videos. "I was sick to see choreography being mistreated in videos like filler with fast cutting and fast editing, really shallow. I don't think choreography should be shot in close-ups." The sequence, initially developed by Gondry, was further expanded and streamlined by choreographer Blanca Li. Costumes for the video were designed by Florence Fontaine, the mother of Gondry's son. The flashing lights were operated by the director's brother, Olivier "Twist" Gondry. As Michel Gondry stated, "It all came down to a family affair."

Elements of the music video appear in the video for the LCD Soundsystem song "Daft Punk Is Playing at My House". The overall design has also been replicated for the Freemasons' "Rain Down Love" video.

Track listings

Charts

Original version

Weekly charts

Year-end charts

Certifications

Alive 2007 version

Release history

References

External links
 
 "Around the World" music video at MTV Music
 Music Video Making Of at YouTube

1997 singles
1997 songs
Daft Punk songs
French house songs
Music videos directed by Michel Gondry
Number-one singles in Iceland
Number-one singles in Italy
Songs written by Guy-Manuel de Homem-Christo
Songs written by Thomas Bangalter
Virgin Records singles